Àlex Corretja was the defending champion but lost in the third round to Marcelo Ríos.

Andy Roddick won in the final 6–2, 6–3 against Sjeng Schalken.

Seeds
The top eight seeds received a bye to the second round.

Draw

Finals

Top half

Section 1

Section 2

Bottom half

Section 3

Section 4

External links
 2001 Legg Mason Tennis Classic draw

2001 ATP Tour